Bute Pursuivant of Arms was a Scottish pursuivant of arms of the Court of the Lord Lyon.

The title of the office derives from the Isle of Bute, which was the personal property of the Scottish monarchs.

The badge of office is A lymphad Sable, flagged Gules in full sail Or charged of a fess chequy Azure and Argent, the yard surmounted of a coronet of four fleur-de-lys (two visible) and four crosses pattee (one and two halves visible) Or.

The office is currently vacant. The most recent Bute Pursuivant of Arms in Ordinary was W David H Sellar (latterly Lord Lyon King of Arms).

Holders of the office

See also
Officer of Arms
Pursuivant
Court of the Lord Lyon
Heraldry Society of Scotland

References

External links
The Court of the Lord Lyon



Court of the Lord Lyon
Offices of arms